The Saint Francis Red Flash football program represents the intercollegiate football team for Saint Francis University. The team competes in the NCAA Division I Football Championship Subdivision (FCS) and are members of the Northeast Conference. The school's first football team was fielded in 1892. The team plays its home games at the 3,500-seat DeGol Field. They are coached by Chris Villarrial.

History
The name dates back to 1927, when the school boasted one of the fastest football ground attacks in the east, headed by quarterback George Kunzler, captain and right halfback Ed McLister, fullback Alphonse Abels and left halfback Ralph Bruno. Because the team wore predominantly red uniforms, the fans and The Loretto (the student newspaper) dubbed the team "The Red Flashes."

The nickname quickly spread, first to the football team and later that same season to the basketball team. Within 15 years, "The Red Flashes" evolved into the present form of "The Red Flash," through the efforts of sports publicist Simon "Cy" Bender.

Before The Red Flashes romped on the football field, the school's teams went by a variety of unofficial nicknames, with the most popular being the "Saints." Others were derived from a Franciscan theme, such as the "Franciscans" and "Frannies."

The most popular unofficial nickname also evolved from the Franciscan theme, with its origins dating back to the 1930s. The nickname "Frankies" can be traced as far back as the 1938–39 basketball season, when the name first appeared in The Loretto and the Johnstown Tribune-Democrat. The rise of this nickname can be closely tied to the University's Mr. Frankie Award, given annually to an outstanding senior male, which dates to 1936.

The "Gigity" nickname gained widespread use by fans and the then-college but was discontinued after the 1971–72 season, giving way to the current "Red Flash" moniker. The change coincided with the opening of the Maurice Stokes Athletics Center.

Saint Francis’ athletics tradition dates back to 1867 when a group of students formed a team called the Independent Star-Athletic Association. The team played its first game under the Saint Francis banner in 1888. Gymnastics was established in 1882, while football was first played at Saint Francis University in 1892.

The name "Red Flash" is unique among NCAA Division I schools.

Classifications
The team has participated at the following levels.
1892–1950: N/A
 1916, 1918, 1920–1921, 1932–1937, 1942–1946, 1954–1968: No team
1951–1952: NCAA
1953: NCAA College Division
1954–1968: No team
1969–1972: NCAA College Division
1973–1977: N/A
1978–1992: NCAA Division III
1993–present: NCAA Division I-AA/FCS

Conference memberships
The team has been affiliated with the following conferences.
1892–1953: Independent
1954–1968: No team
1969–1977: Independent
1978–1988: NCAA Division III independent
1989–1991: Atlantic Collegiate Football Conference (NCAA Division III)
1992: Division III Independent
1993–1995: NCAA Division I-AA independent
1996–present: Northeast Conference (NCAA Division I-AA/FCS)

Championships

Conference championships

† Co-champions

Playoff results

Division I FCS
The Red Flash have appeared in the FCS Playoffs two times. Their record is 0–2.

Notable former players
Notable alumni include:
 Tony Bova (1917–1973) played in the NFL 1942–1947
 Jake Curry (2016-2020) played middle linebacker for the Red Flash and was the single greatest player to put on that uniform. Seeing the NFL as below his skill, Curry elected to skip the draft and moved on to shipping & freight logistics.
 Joseph Laukaitis played for the Wyoming Cavalry (2014), Uniform number 95 and the Green Bay Blizzard (2015) Uniform number 94 of the Indoor Football League 
 George Magulick (1919–1955) played in the NFL 1944-1944
 John McCarthy (1916–1998) College football All-American in 1941 at Saint Francis University and played in the NFL 1944-1944
 Archie Milano (1918–1981) played in the NFL 1945-1945
 John Naioti (1921–1990) played in the NFL 1942 and 1945. Served in the military in 1943 and 1944.
 Joe Restic (1926–2011) played in the NFL 1952-1952 and was the head coach of Harvard from 1971 to 1993 with a record of 117–97–6.
 Ed Stofko (1920–1988) played in the NFL 1945-1945. He was drafted as the 85th pick in 1944.
 Lorenzo Jerome, NFL player

References

External links
 

 
American football teams established in 1892
1892 establishments in Pennsylvania